Jalihala is a village in Bagalkot district in Karnataka, India.

References
AMS Maps of India and Pakistan

Villages in Bagalkot district